= Z-Division =

Z-Division — is a Special Projects Group of the Lawrence Livermore National Laboratory established to provide the United States Intelligence Community with technical assessments of foreign nuclear programs and weapons capabilities. Z-Division was formed in 1965, bringing together scientists and engineers to help intelligence agencies understand the significance of Soviet nuclear weapons tests. The letter 'Z' was chosen as most letters were already assigned to other divisions. Relationships with the American intelligence community were formalised by a memorandum of understanding drawn up between the Central Intelligence Agency (CIA) and the Atomic Energy Commission (now the Department of Energy) in the same year. The division has been described as "more or less" the intelligence arm of the Livermore Laboratory.
